George Marshall was elected to the House of Assembly of Jamaica in 1820.

References 

Members of the House of Assembly of Jamaica
Year of birth missing
Year of death missing